The Menominee River Park Archeological District is an archaeological site located near Kingsford, Michigan.  The location was a campsite associated with the Woodland period, and is currently used as a recreational park.   It was listed on the National Register of Historic Places in 1995.

References

Dickinson County, Michigan
Archaeological sites on the National Register of Historic Places in Michigan
Historic districts on the National Register of Historic Places in Michigan
National Register of Historic Places in Dickinson County, Michigan